Prostějov District(German: Bezirk Proßnitz) is a district (okres) within the Olomouc Region of the Czech Republic. Its capital is the city of Prostějov.

List of municipalities
Alojzov -
Bedihošť -
Bílovice-Lutotín -
Biskupice -
Bohuslavice -
Bousín -
Březsko -
Brodek u Konice -
Brodek u Prostějova -
Budětsko -
Buková -
Čechy pod Kosířem -
Čehovice -
Čelčice -
Čelechovice na Hané -
Dětkovice -
Dobrochov -
Dobromilice -
Doloplazy -
Drahany -
Dřevnovice -
Držovice -
Dzbel -
Hačky -
Hluchov -
Horní Štěpánov -
Hradčany-Kobeřice -
Hrdibořice -
Hrubčice -
Hruška -
Hvozd -
Ivaň -
Jesenec -
Kladky -
Klenovice na Hané -
Klopotovice -
Konice -
Kostelec na Hané -
Koválovice-Osíčany -Kralice na Hané -
Krumsín -
Laškov -
Lešany -
Lipová -
Ludmírov -
Malé Hradisko -
Mořice -
Mostkovice -
Myslejovice -
Němčice nad Hanou -Nezamyslice -
Niva -
Obědkovice -
Ochoz -
Ohrozim -
Olšany u Prostějova -
Ondratice -
Otaslavice -
Otinoves -
Pavlovice u Kojetína -
Pěnčín -
Pivín -
Plumlov -
Polomí -
Přemyslovice -
Prostějov -
Prostějovičky -Protivanov -
Ptení -
Raková u Konice -
Rakůvka -
Rozstání -
Seloutky -
Skalka -
Skřípov -
Slatinky -
Smržice -
Srbce -
Stařechovice -
Stínava -
Stražisko -
Šubířov -
Suchdol -Tištín'' -
Tvorovice -
Určice -
Víceměřice -
Vícov -
Vincencov -
Vitčice -
Vranovice-Kelčice -
Vrbátky -
Vrchoslavice -
Vřesovice -
Výšovice -
Zdětín -
Želeč

References

 
Districts of the Czech Republic